During the 2007–08 English football season, Bristol City F.C. competed in the Football League Championship, following promotion from League One the previous season.

Season summary
In the summer between City's promotion and the start of the Championship season, Gary Johnson made a number of signings. However their pre-season form did not start well, losing 4–2 to Forest Green Rovers and 3–1 to Motherwell F.C. as the club trialed various players. However City got off to a good start going unbeaten for a number of matches and briefly topping the Championship after beating Coventry City 3–0. City then suffered a slight blip after losing 3–0 to Barnsley before beating several big teams, including Sheffield United (live on Sky Sports) and Southampton. In November, City's form dipped and they endured a run of 4 games without a win, including a 6–0 thrashing at the hands of Ipswich Town. In December, City's form picked up again and went unbeaten all the way to Boxing Day, when they lost to West Bromwich Albion 4–1.

After a stop-start run of form, including victories over Blackpool and Coventry City and losses to Queens Park Rangers and Crystal Palace, City went top of the Championship on 1 March, after a 2–1 home victory over Hull City. After some indifferent results, City went back to the top after a last-gasp winner from Steve Brooker, who was just returning from injury, in a 2–1 win over Norwich City. However a poor run ended City's chances of an automatic promotion place. On 4 May 2008, a 3–0 home win against Preston North End on the final day of the league season ensured a playoff place and a semi-final fixture against Crystal Palace. On 13 May 2008, a 4–2 aggregate win over Crystal Palace with goals from Lee Trundle and Michael McIndoe confirmed City's trip to Wembley, where they were beaten 1–0 by Hull City. At the end of the season, defender Bradley Orr and midfielder Marvin Elliott were both included in the PFA Team of the Year, while goalkeeper Adriano Basso was named the club's player of the season. Elliott was the club's young player of the season.

Kit
Bristol City's kit was manufactured by German company Puma and sponsored by Bristol Trade Centre. The club's away kit was all black with white trimmings and rendered in the same template as the home kit; the third kit featured black shorts, white shirts and black and white socks.

Final league table

Results
Bristol City's score comes first

Legend

Football League Championship

Championship play-offs

FA Cup

League Cup

Squad statistics
Source:

Numbers in parentheses denote appearances as substitute.
Players with squad numbers struck through and marked  left the club during the playing season.
Players with names in italics and marked * were on loan from another club for the whole of their season with Bristol City.
Players listed with no appearances have been in the matchday squad but only as unused substitutes.
Key to positions: GK – Goalkeeper; DF – Defender; MF – Midfielder; FW – Forward

References

Bristol City F.C. seasons
Bristol City F.C.